Ève Péclet (born December 3, 1988) is a Canadian politician who was elected to the House of Commons of Canada in the 2011 election. She represented the electoral district of La Pointe-de-l'Île as a member of the New Democratic Party.

She was a member of the debate team at the Université de Montréal, and is a law school graduate. In February 2011, she appeared in an episode of the reality show Un souper presque parfait (the Quebec version of Come Dine with Me) on the V television network.

She lost her seat in parliament to Bloc Québécois candidate Mario Beaulieu in Canada's 42nd general election in 2015. She was again defeated in the 2019 federal election.

Electoral record

References

External links

NDP.ca profile

1988 births
Women members of the House of Commons of Canada
French Quebecers
Living people
Members of the House of Commons of Canada from Quebec
New Democratic Party MPs
Participants in Canadian reality television series
Politicians from Montreal
Université de Montréal alumni
21st-century Canadian politicians
21st-century Canadian women politicians